was a composite hulled, steam gunboat, serving in the early Imperial Japanese Navy. She was the third vessel to be completed in the four vessel , and was named after Mount Atago in Kyoto.

Background
Atago was an iron-ribbed, iron-sheathed, two-masted gunboat with a horizontal double expansion reciprocating steam engine with two cylindrical boilers driving two screws. She also had two masts for a schooner sail rig.

Atago was laid down at the Yokosuka Naval Arsenal on 17 July 1886 and launched on 18 June 1887. She was completed on 2 March 1889. To distinguish her from her sister ships, she had a yellow belt painted on her hull.

Operational history
Atago saw combat service in the First Sino-Japanese War of 1894-1895 under the command of Lieutenant Commander Inoue Yoshitomo, patrolling between Korea, Dairen and escorting Japanese transports. After the surrender of China, Atago and Chōkai remained at Weihaihei as part of the Japanese occupation force.

On 21 March 1898, Atago was re-designated as a second-class gunboat, and was used for coastal survey and patrol duties. During the Boxer Rebellion, Atago was assigned to patrol off the Taku Forts from June to October 1900 under the command of Commander Heitarō Takenouchi.

During the Russo-Japanese War of 1904-1905, Atago was initially assigned to operations on the Liao River along with the cruiser . She later assisted in the Siege of Port Arthur, and in early October 1904 captured a Chinese junk with military supplies destined for the port. While on patrol outside Port Arthur on 6 November she ran aground due to fog on rocks southwest of the harbor at position , and sank. She was removed the navy list on 15 June 1905.

Notes

References
 Corbett, Sir Julian. Maritime Operations in The Russo-Japanese War 1904-1905. (1994) Originally classified, and in two volumes, 
Chesneau, Roger and Eugene M. Kolesnik (editors), All The World's Fighting Ships 1860-1905, Conway Maritime Press, 1979 reprinted 2002, 

Maya-class gunboats
Ships built by Yokosuka Naval Arsenal
1887 ships
First Sino-Japanese War naval ships of Japan
Russo-Japanese War naval ships of Japan
Maritime incidents in 1904
Shipwrecks in the Yellow Sea
Shipwrecks of the Russo-Japanese War
Naval ships of Japan